Stapleford Woods form an area of ancient woodland and forest in Stapleford, Lincolnshire, England. The boundary of the ancient woods follows the county boundary between Lincolnshire and Nottinghamshire.

History
Left in ancient times to Trinity College, Cambridge, the  site was clear-felled during the early stages of World War I to supply local industry. Left unplanted between the wars, the grounds were used as a British Army camp and training grounds during World War II.

In September 1943 No. 239 Squadron RAF had moved to RAF Ayr to train as a night fighter unit, and re-equipped with the De Havilland Mosquito. It then moved to RAF West Raynham, Norfolk to join No. 100 (Bomber Support) Group, participating in night time operations against enemy Nazi-Luftwaffe fighters. On 27 October 1944 during fighter affiliation training with No. 49 Squadron RAF, a Mosquito piloted by F/Lt J.H.Roberts and accompanied by Flight Engineer Sgt. A.M.Ashcroft, stalled and crashed in the woods, with the immediate death of both pilot and passenger.

After hostilities had ceased in late 1945, the woods were bought by the newly formed Forestry Commission. Along with much woodland in the River Trent valley, the site was extensively replanted in the 1950s with Scots and Corsican pine, chosen to supply local industry.

Present
Now a managed working forest under the care of Forestry England, surveys in 2004 found that the wood dated back at least 400 years, making it a designated ancient woodland. Initial clearance of a  area yielded a resultant crop of purple flowering heather, which germinated from seeds that had been buried for over 70 years.

Leisure
The Forestry England car park  gives access to a circular walk, which takes 30-40 minutes to complete. The car park can be accessed from Coddington Lane whilst travelling through the wood.

The Real Badlands

The woods were the main backdrop for the 2009 documentary film The Real Badlands produced by Current TV and Rockwood Pictures, by British filmmakers Tim Clark and Craig Ford. The film tells the story of a Newark-on-Trent couple (Simon Burgess and Susan Moran) fed up with modern-day life, who quit their jobs, sell all of their possessions and move into the woods.

The film was shot in the woods and Kelham, near Newark, during the summer and winter of 2008. After release the film was controversial, due to claims that the film was in fact a mockumentary. The filmmakers publicly denied these claims in a written statement read out live on Current TV, minutes after the film was broadcast.

References

External links

Stapleford Woods at Forestry England
Stapleford Woods at Lincolnshire County Council
Forests and woodlands of Lincolnshire
North Kesteven District